This is a list of typical Seoul dishes found in Korean cuisine.

Main dishes

Gukbap, soup with rice
Heukimjajuk, black sesame porridge
Jatjuk, pine nut porridge
Memil mandu, dumpling with a buckwheat covering
Pyeonsu, square-shaped mandu (dumpling) with vegetable filling.
Saengchi mandu, dumpling stuffed with pheasant meat
Seolleongtang, beef soup with rice
Tteokguk, rice cake soup

Channyu; accompanied side dishes

Amchi, dried salted brown croaker
Eochae, parboiled fish fillet
Gaksaek jeongol, casserole made with various ingredients
Galbijjim, braised meat short ribs
Gannap, beef liver pancake
Gaphoe, seasoned raw beef tripe
Gimssam, wraps with gim, seaweed
Gujeolpan, nine-sectioned plate
Gulbi, dried salted yellow croaker
Gulhoe, raw oyster
Gwamegi, half-dried Pacific herring or Pacific saury
Hobakseon, steamed stuffed zucchini
Honghapcho, braised mussels in soy sauce
Jang kimchi, water kimchi seasoned with soy sauce
Jangajji, pickles.
Jeonbokcho, braised abalone
Jeotgal, salted fermented seafood
Jokpyeon, gelatin
Maedeup jaban, fried kombu in a ribbon shape
Mitbanchan, basic side dishes made for preservation
Mugeun namul bokkeum, sauteed dried various mountain vegetables
Pyeonyuk
Useol pyeonyuk, pressed ox's tongue
Yangjimeori pyeonyuk, pressed beef bricket
Sinseollo, royal casserole
Suk kkakdugi, kimchi made with parboiled radish
Sukju namul, sauteed mung bean spouts
Suran, poached egg
Tteokbokki, stir-fried tteok, and vegetables
Tteokjjim, boiled tteok, beef and vegetables
Yukgaejang, spicy beef soup with rice
Yukpo, beef jerky

Tteok; rice cakes

Tteokrice cakes
Danja
Daechu danja, made with jujube
Ssukgullae danja, made with Artemisia princeps var. orientalis
Bam danja, made with chestnut
Yuja danja, made with yuzu
Eunghaeng danja, made with Gingko seeds
Geonsi danja, made with gotgam (dried persimmon)
Yulmu danja, made with Coix lacryma-jobi var. ma-yuen
Seogi danja, made with seogi (Umbilicaria esculenta)
Duteop tteok, covered with azuki bean crumbles
Gaksaekpyeon, made by adding color or flavors
Hwajeon, made with flower petals
Juak, made by pan-frying and honey-glazing
Mulhobak tteok, made with pumpkin
Neuti tteok, made with young leaves of Zelkova serrata
Sangchu tteok, made with lettuce
Solbangul tteok, made with pine cones
Yaksik, made with nuts and jujubes

Hangwa; Korean confectionery

Hangwa or Korean confectioneries
Dasik, pattern pressed cake eaten when drinking tea.
Heukimja dasik, made with black sesame seeds
Kong dasik, made with soybean
Songhwa dasik, made with pine pollen powder
Bam dasik, made with chestnut
Jinmal dasik, made with a mixture of wheat flour and honey
Nongmal dasik, made with starch
Ssal dasik, made with rice
Maejakgwa, oil-and-honey flour pastry
Mandugwa, fried dumpling filled with sweeten jujube
Silkkae yeotgangjeong, covered with sesame seeds
Ttangkong yeotgangjeong, covered with peanuts
Baekjapyeon, covered with ground pine nuts
Yakgwa, oil-and-honey pastry
Yeotgangjeong, yeat mixed with roasted or raw grain.

Eumcheongny; non-alcoholic beverages

Hwachae

Hwachae, cold Korean punch made with fruits, edible flower petals, tteok, steamed grains, or traditional medical ingredients
Bori sudan, barley punch
Huintteok sudan, punch with garaetteok, cylindrical tteok
Jindallae hwachae, punch with azalea petals
Omija hwachae, Schisandra chinensis berry punch
Wonsobyeong, punch with rice balls

Korean tea

Korean teaDaechu-cha, made with jujubeDanggwi-cha, made with AngelicaGokcha, made with grainsGugija-cha, made with wolfberriesGyeolmyeongja-cha, made with Senna obtusifoliaGyepi-cha, made with cinnamonJeho-tang, made with various traditional medicine was considered the best summer drink at Korean royal court. The cold drink is made with honey, water and the powders of dried and roasted Prunus mume fruits, Amomi Semen, Sandalwood Red, and Amomum tsao-ko.Misam-cha, made with Ginseng radicleMogwa-cha, made with Chinese QuinceOgwa-cha, literally means "five fruits" is made with walnuts, chestnuts, Gingko seeds, jujube, and ginger.Omija-cha, made with Schisandra chinensis berriesSaenggang-cha, made with gingerYuja-cha'', made with yuja

See also

Korean cuisine
Korean royal court cuisine
Korean temple cuisine
List of Korean dishes

References

External links
Official site of Korea National Tourism List of Korean Food 
Food in Korea at the Korea Agro-Fisheries Trade Corporation

Seoul
Culture of Seoul
dishes